Quail Lake is an artificial lake in Los Angeles County, California. Situated in the San Andreas Rift Zone along the north side of State Route 138, it is a regulatory storage body for the West Branch California Aqueduct. The community of Centennial is a proposed  master-planned community that will be built on a portion of Tejon Ranch to the northeast of the lake.

See also
List of lakes in California

References

Reservoirs in Los Angeles County, California
Reservoirs in California
Reservoirs in Southern California